Hygrocybe erythrocala is a mushroom of the waxcap genus Hygrocybe. It grows in moist, shady conditions near Sydney, Australia. The cap is viscid and glossy with striations; this species lacks decurrent gills. It was described in 1997 by the mycologist Anthony M. Young.

References

Fungi described in 1997
Fungi of Australia
erythrocala